Chepiha is a surname. It means "ploughstaff" in Ukrainian. Notable people with the surname include:

 Valentyna Chepiha (born 1962), Ukrainian bodybuilder
 Zakhary Chepiha (1725–1797), Cossack leader

See also
 
 Chepiga

Ukrainian-language surnames